Interstate 694 (I-694) is an east–west auxiliary Interstate Highway located in the Minneapolis–Saint Paul metropolitan area in the US state of Minnesota. The western terminus of the route is at its junction with I-94, I-494, and US Highway 52 (US 52) in Maple Grove. The eastern terminus of I-694 is at its junction with I-94 and I-494 at the Woodbury–Oakdale city line. I-694 comprises the northern and northeastern portions of a beltway around the Twin Cities, with I-494 forming the remainder of the beltway. Interstate Highways outside of the loop in Minnesota may be signed as high as  but can only reach  inside the loop.

I-694 also interchanges with I-35W at New Brighton–Arden Hills and I-35E at Little Canada–Vadnais Heights.

Route description

I-694 begins on the counterclockwise end at the junction of I-94, I-494, US 52, and I-694 in the city of Maple Grove, often referred to as the Fish Lake Interchange. From the Fish Lake Interchange, I-694 travels eastbound (clockwise) and concurrently with I-94 and US 52 through the cities of Maple Grove, Brooklyn Park, and Brooklyn Center. In Brooklyn Center, I-94/US 52 splits from I-694 and then I-94/US 52 travels south toward downtown Minneapolis, while I-694 continues its beltway function, crossing the Mississippi River on the I-694 Bridge. The route then passes through the communities of Fridley and New Brighton, where it has an interchange with I-35W. I-694 turns slightly to the southeast as it passes through the communities of Arden Hills, Shoreview, and Little Canada. I-694 turns back to near due east at its western junction with I-35E. It continues east through the communities of Vadnais Heights, White Bear Lake, and Maplewood. In Pine Springs, I-694 has a cloverleaf interchange with Minnesota State Highway 36 (MN 36). The I-694/MN 36 interchange makes out a rough corner, in which I-694 switches direction from eastbound to southbound. I-694 continues south through the city of Oakdale and finally terminates on the clockwise end at the interchange of I-94, I-494, and I-694 at the Oakdale–Woodbury city boundary line. I-694 becomes I-494 after this interchange.

Mileposts on I-694 are numbered to increase while traveling eastbound (clockwise). They are in sequence with the numbering of adjoining I-494, where the numbering begins and ends at the Minnesota River. Between Maple Grove and Brooklyn Center, the mileposts correspond to the beltway numbering, not I-94 mileage.

Legally, the route of I-694 is defined as part of unmarked legislative route 393 in the Minnesota Statutes §161.12(5). I-694 is not marked with this legislative number along the actual highway. The entire freeway, as part of the Interstate Highway System, has been included in the National Highway System, a system of roads important to the country's economy, defense, and mobility.

History
The original beltway around the Twin Cities was MN 100. The portion of I-694 running east from the current MN 100 in Brooklyn Center through New Brighton and MN 100 was part of that original beltway. There was a two-lane bridge across the Mississippi river where the current I-694 bridge is today. That bridge was constructed as part of a defense initiative authorized in 1942 at the beginning of US involvement World War II.

The construction of I-694 to Interstate standards was authorized in 1956. The first section of I-694 completed was between US 10 at Arden Hills to I-35E at Little Canada in the early 1960s. The last section of I-694 completed was between I-35E at Little Canada to its junction with I-94 and I-494 at Oakdale–Woodbury, completed by the early 1970s.

I-694 was built as the main thoroughfare for the northern suburbs of Minneapolis–Saint Paul. These include the cities of Maple Grove, Brooklyn Park, Brooklyn Center, Fridley, New Brighton, Arden Hills, Shoreview, Little Canada, Vadnais Heights, White Bear Lake, Maplewood, Pine Springs, and Oakdale.

The original design of I-694 had problems with "weave" interchanges. The Unweave the Weave construction project, completed between 2004 and 2008, disentangled I-694 and I-35E at Little Canada–Vadnais Heights. The project was designed to increase traffic flow, driver safety, and improve the condition of the roadway. Another construction project, the I-35W/US 10/I-694 North Central Corridor Reconstruction Project, also designed to reduce unnecessary traffic crossovers on the highway, began in September 2011. This project eliminated the weaving movements of I-694 at its interchange with US 10 and MN 51 in Arden Hills. This interchange often created one of the worst bottlenecks in the Twin Cities because drivers need to change at least one lane to continue either direction on I-694 between MN 51 (Snelling Avenue) and US 10. When the construction project was completed, the roadway of I-694 included two through lanes in each direction from I-35W at New Brighton to US 10 at Arden Hills, three through lanes in each direction from US 10 in Arden Hills to Rice Street at Shoreview–Little Canada, and five through lanes in each direction from Rice Street to the I-694/I-35E interchange, compared with the current two to three lanes throughout the I-694 corridor.

Exit list
Exit numbers continue from I-494.

See also 
Unweave the Weave
I-35W/US 10/I-694 North Central Corridor Reconstruction Project

References

External links

I-694 at The Unofficial Minnesota Highways Page

Interstate Highways in Minnesota
Auxiliary Interstate Highways
Interstate 94
Interstate 94-6
Interstate 94-6
Interstate 94-6
Interstate 94-6
694